Poon Siu-ping, BBS,  MH (born 1957) is a former member of the Legislative Council of Hong Kong for Labour constituency. He is also the chairman of the Federation of Hong Kong and Kowloon Labour Unions.

Background
Poon was in the Election Committee for the Labour constituency from 1996 to 1998, which he rejoined in 2006.  He was a member of the Mandatory Provident Fund Schemes Advisory Committee between 1998 and 2005. In 2012, he succeeded Li Fung-ying in the Legislative Council of Hong Kong as an uncontested candidate in the Labour constituency.

References

1957 births
Living people
Hong Kong trade unionists
HK LegCo Members 2012–2016
HK LegCo Members 2016–2021
Members of the Selection Committee of Hong Kong
Members of the Election Committee of Hong Kong, 1998–2000
Members of the Election Committee of Hong Kong, 2000–2005
Members of the Election Committee of Hong Kong, 2012–2017